The Benjamin Hoyt House is a historic house located at 134 Otis Street in Cambridge, Massachusetts.

Description and history 
The -story wood-frame house was built in 1868, and is one of the only bracketed Italianate houses to survive in East Cambridge. It has a front-facing gable whose cornice includes dentil moulding and brackets, and whose fully pedimented gable end has a round-arch window in the tympanum area. The main roof cornice also has dentil moulding and paired brackets, and the front windows have slightly projecting lintel caps.

The house was listed on the National Register of Historic Places on April 13, 1982.

See also
National Register of Historic Places listings in Cambridge, Massachusetts

References

Houses on the National Register of Historic Places in Cambridge, Massachusetts
Italianate architecture in Massachusetts
Houses completed in 1868